BPL is the call sign of the official long-wave time signal service of the People's Republic of China, operated by the Chinese Academy of Sciences, broadcasting on 100 kHz from CAS's National Time Service Center in  Pucheng County, Shaanxi at , roughly 70 km northeast of Lintong, along with NTSC's short-wave time signal BPM on 2.5, 5.0, 10.0, and 15.0 MHz.

BPL broadcasts LORAN-C compatible format signal from 5:30 to 13:30 UTC, using an 800 kW transmitter covering a radius up to 3000 km.

References

External links 
 长波授时 (Longwave time signal), from the National Time Service Center, Chinese Academy of Sciences

Time signal radio stations